Phoenicladocera is a genus of moths in the family Lasiocampidae from Madagascar. The genus was erected by Yves de Lajonquière in 1970.

Species
Some species of this genus are: 
Phoenicladocera griveaudi De Lajonquière, 1972
Phoenicladocera herbuloti De Lajonquière, 1972
Phoenicladocera lajonquierei Viette, 1981
Phoenicladocera merina De Lajonquière, 1970
Phoenicladocera nitescens De Lajonquière, 1972
Phoenicladocera parvinota (Hering, 1929)
Phoenicladocera toulgoeti De Lajonquière, 1972
Phoenicladocera turtur De Lajonquière, 1972
Phoenicladocera viettei De Lajonquière, 1970
Phoenicladocera vulpicolor (Kenrick, 1914)
Phoenicladocera wintreberti De Lajonquière, 1972
Phoenicladocera xanthogramma De Lajonquière, 1972

References

Lasiocampidae
Moth genera